Ronald Brown (born 2 September 1995) is a South African rugby sevens player. He competed in the men's tournament at the 2020 Summer Olympics. In 2022, He was part of the South African team that won their second Commonwealth Games gold medal in Birmingham.

References

External links
 

1995 births
Living people
Male rugby sevens players
Olympic rugby sevens players of South Africa
Rugby sevens players at the 2020 Summer Olympics
Place of birth missing (living people)
Rugby sevens players at the 2022 Commonwealth Games
Commonwealth Games gold medallists for South Africa
Commonwealth Games medallists in rugby sevens
Medallists at the 2022 Commonwealth Games